Goin' Fishin' is a 1940 Our Gang short comedy film directed by Edward Cahn.  It was the 191st Our Gang short (192nd episode, 103rd talking short, 104th talking episode, and 23rd MGM produced episode) that was released.

Plot
Hoping to get an early start on a fishing trip to the East River, the gang boards a double-decker bus at the crack of dawn. Alas, the kids' bulky fishing equipment causes nothing but discomfort for the rest of the passengers, to say nothing of the irascible bus conductor. Thanks to the gang's unintentional interference, the bus' regular pick-up and drop-off schedule is thoroughly disrupted, and even worse, it turns out that the kids are on the wrong bus.

Cast

The Gang
 Mickey Gubitosi as Mickey
 George McFarland as Spanky
 Carl Switzer as Alfalfa
 Billie Thomas as Buckwheat
 Leonard Landy as Leonard

Additional cast
 Paul Hurst as Bus conductor
 Robert Emmett as Police officer
 Ben Hall as Man on bus
 Arthur Hoyt as Man on bus
 Anne O'Neal as Woman on bus

See also
 Our Gang filmography

References

External links
 
 

1940 films
American black-and-white films
Films directed by Edward L. Cahn
Metro-Goldwyn-Mayer short films
1940 comedy films
Our Gang films
1940 short films
1940s American films